Ellen Bergli (born 27 October 1945) is a Norwegian politician for the Labour Party.

She served as a deputy representative to the Norwegian Parliament from Troms during the term 1997–2001.

Between 2000 and 2001, during the first cabinet Stoltenberg, she was appointed State Secretary in the Ministry of Fisheries.

References

1945 births
Living people
Deputy members of the Storting
Troms politicians
Labour Party (Norway) politicians
Norwegian state secretaries
Women members of the Storting
Norwegian women state secretaries